Anthony Orchard (born 22 May 1946) is a retired botanist who worked at the State Herbarium of South Australia. His main interests were the study of the genera Rosaceae, Haloragaceae, Asteraceae and Rubiaceae.

Anthony (Tony) Orchard is a systematic botanist who, prior to his retirement, collected widely across Australia and New Zealand. Most of the specimens are in the Adelaide and Hobart herbaria. He had editorial and executive roles related to the publication of the Flora of Australia and the Australian Plant Census.

Standard author abbreviation

References

External links

1946 births
Living people
Botanists active in Australia
20th-century Australian botanists
21st-century Australian botanists
Australian Botanical Liaison Officers